Lubomír Kubica (born 10 March 1979) is a Czech association footballer who last played for Tescoma Zlín in the Czech 2. Liga.

Club career
Kubica previously played for Baník Ostrava, Drnovice in the Czech Gambrinus liga, Irtysh Pavlodar in Kazakhstan, AS Trenčín in the Slovak Corgoň liga, for Maribor in the Slovenian Prva Liga Telekom Slovenije, for Ashdod in the Israeli Premier League and Inter Baku in the Azerbaijan Premier League.

References

External links
 Profile at Inter Baku's Official Site
 Profile at NK Maribor
 Stats from Maribor on PrvaLiga
 Profile at ČMFS website
 http://www.one.co.il/Article/131468.html

Living people
1979 births
Place of birth missing (living people)
Czech footballers
Czech First League players
Israeli Premier League players
FC Baník Ostrava players
FK Drnovice players
FC Fastav Zlín players
NK Maribor players
Slovenian PrvaLiga players
F.C. Ashdod players
Shamakhi FK players
AS Trenčín players
Slovak Super Liga players
Czech expatriate footballers
Expatriate footballers in Israel
Expatriate footballers in Kazakhstan
Expatriate footballers in Slovakia
Expatriate footballers in Slovenia
Expatriate footballers in Azerbaijan
Association football midfielders
Czech expatriate sportspeople in Kazakhstan
Czech expatriate sportspeople in Israel
Czech expatriate sportspeople in Slovakia
Czech expatriate sportspeople in Slovenia
Czech expatriate sportspeople in Azerbaijan
Czech Republic youth international footballers
Czech Republic under-21 international footballers
People from Hranice (Přerov District)
Sportspeople from the Olomouc Region